The 2020–21 Pro A season, for sponsorships reasons the Jeep Élite, was the 99th season of the Pro A, the top basketball league in France organised by the Ligue Nationale de Basket (LNB). It was the fourth season with Jeep as main sponsor. The season began on 26 September 2020 and ended on 26 June 2021.

LDLC ASVEL won its 20th league championship by defeating JDA Dijon in the final.

Format
Different from previous seasons, the playoffs were played in a single-elimination format.

Teams 

Because the 2019–20 season was curtailed due to the COVID-19 pandemic no teams were relegated and promoted.

Locations and arenas

Regular season

League table

Playoffs
The playoffs were played in a single-elimination format and began on 20 June 2021 and ended 26 June 2021. The semifinals and finals were played at the Kindarena in Rouen.

Awards
MVP: Bonzie Colson (SIG Strasbourg)
Final MVP David Lighty (LDLC ASVEL)
Best Young Player: Victor Wembanyama (LDLC ASVEL)
Best Sixth Man: Pierre Pelos (JL Bourg)
Best Coach: Zvezdan Mitrović (Monaco)

References

External links
Official website

LNB Pro A seasons
French
LNB Pro A